Brunfelsia uniflora (syn. Brunfelsia hopeana), the manac, is a species of flowering plant in the family Solanaceae. It is native to Monos island of Trinidad and Tobago, Venezuela, the Venezuelan Antilles, Guyana, Brazil, and northwest Argentina, and has been introduced to eastern Tropical Africa, Réunion, Mauritius, India, and Assam.

References

uniflora
Flora of Trinidad and Tobago
Flora of the Venezuelan Antilles
Flora of Venezuela
Flora of Guyana
Flora of Brazil
Flora of Northwest Argentina
Plants described in 1829